Alan Hughes' Family Fortunes was an Irish television game show, based on the American game show Family Feud. Hosted by Alan Hughes it aired on TV3 in Ireland on Saturday nights at 9pm.

Format
Two family teams, each with five members, would be asked to guess the results of surveys, in which 100 people would be asked open ended questions (e.g. "we asked 100 people to name something associated with the country Iceland" or "we asked 100 people to name a breed of dog"). Each round begins with a member of each team (in rotation, meaning all players did this at least once) approaching the podium. As the question was read, the first of the two nominees to hit a buzzer gives an answer. If this is not the top answer, the other nominee is asked. The team with the higher answer then chooses whether to "play" the question, or "pass" control to the other team (in reality, the teams rarely chose to pass). The host then passed down the line of the controlling team, asking for an answer from each. After each answer, the board revealed whether this answer featured. If a family managed to come up with all the answers on the board (most commonly six in the early part of the show, reduced in number after the commercial break), they won the euro equivalent of the total number of people who had given the answers.

Every time someone gave an answer that was not on the board or ran out of time, the family was charged a strike;  accumulating three strikes means the family loses control of the board, and the other family has the chance to steal, with only the head of the family giving one answer.  If the answer is one of the remaining answers, they won the round and the money;  otherwise, the opponents won the money that was on the board.

After the first half, answers were worth €2 times the score. The family who scored the most euros played Big Money. The losing team's winnings would be doubled. Big Money awarded €1,000 (€2,500 on celebrity specials) for scoring 200 points. Naming all 5 top answers and scoring 200 points doubled said jackpot.

Reception
Patrick Freyne, writing about the first episode in the Evening Herald, commented "[Presenter Alan] Hughes gasped and goofed like a vat of fake tan, teeth-whitener and Just For Men which had come to life during a lightning storm".

References

External links
Official Site (via Internet Archive)
TV3 reveal they've axed Alan Hughes' Family Fortunes - in a bid to save money

2012 Irish television series debuts
2014 Irish television series endings
Family Feud
Irish game shows
Virgin Media Television (Ireland) original programming
Television game shows with incorrect disambiguation